Élisabeth Toutut-Picard (born 17 December 1954) is a French politician of La République En Marche! (LREM) who has been serving as a member of the French National Assembly since the 2017 elections, representing the 7th constituency of the Haute-Garonne department. Picard contracted COVID-19 on 7 March 2020 during the COVID-19 pandemic.

Political career
In parliament, Toutut-Picard serves as member of the Committee on Sustainable Development and Spatial Planning. In addition to he committee assignments, he is part of the parliamentary friendship group with Algeria and New Zealand. In 2020, Toutut-Picard joined En commun (EC), a group within LREM led by Barbara Pompili.

Political positions
In July 2019, Toutut-Picard decided not to align with her parliamentary group's majority and became one of 52 LREM members who abstained from a vote on the French ratification of the European Union’s Comprehensive Economic and Trade Agreement (CETA) with Canada.

See also
 2017 French legislative election

References

1954 births
Living people
Deputies of the 15th National Assembly of the French Fifth Republic
La République En Marche! politicians
21st-century French women politicians
Place of birth missing (living people)
Women members of the National Assembly (France)
Members of Parliament for Haute-Garonne